This is the list of winners and nominees of the César Award for Best Original Music. Before 2000, the award was called "César Award for Best Music". With three awards out of ten nominations, Alexandre Desplat is both the most nominated and most rewarded composer.

Winners and nominees

1970s

1980s

1990s

2000s

2010s

2020s

See also
Academy Award for Best Original Score
BAFTA Award for Best Film Music
European Film Award for Best Composer
Magritte Award for Best Original Score

References

External links 
  
 César Award for Best Music Written for a Film at AlloCiné

Music
Film music awards